William Coffin Coleman (May 21, 1870 – November 2, 1957) was a businessman, the American founder of the Coleman Company, a maker of camping equipment, and a politician. He served as the Mayor of Wichita, Kansas from 1923 to 1924.

Biography
Coleman was born in Chatham, New York in 1870. His parents moved the family to Labette County, Kansas in 1871, and in 1881 his father died. William started earning money by selling small goods as a child. 

After he got older, he became a salesman, a good entry position for someone with limited education but much energy.
 
While he was selling typewriters in Alabama, Coleman saw a lantern that used gasoline instead of kerosene. He switched his sales to lanterns, believing these would be useful. He began to craft his own lantern, which he marketed as the Coleman Arc Lamp. 

In 1901 Coleman married Fanny Sheldon and they moved to Wichita, Kansas. They had two children: Sheldon and Clarence Coleman. 

Coleman also developed what he called the G.I. pocket stove, in addition to the gasoline lamp.  The business was now called the Coleman Lamp and Stove Company. after two decades in Wichita, Coleman entered politics, joining the Republican Party. He was elected as mayor of Wichita for one two-year term, serving 1923 through 1924. 

Coleman died in Wichita, Kansas on November 2, 1957 from a heart attack. He is buried in Old Mission Mausoleum, Wichita, Kansas.

See also
Coleman Lantern
G.I. pocket stove

References

External links

Businesspeople from Kansas
People from Chatham, New York
Mayors of Wichita, Kansas
1870 births
1957 deaths
Kansas Republicans